The sign of the cross is a ritual hand motion used by some Christians.

Sign of the Cross may also refer to:
 The Sign of the Cross (play), an 1895 play by Wilson Barrett
 The Sign of the Cross (1914 film), a 1914 American film directed by Frederick A. Thomson, based on Barrett's play
 The Sign of the Cross (1932 film), a 1932 American film directed by Cecil B. DeMille, based on Barrett's play
 The Sign of the Cross (book), 1994 book by Colm Tóibín
 Sign of the Cross (novel), 2006 novel by Chris Kuzneski
 "Sign of the Cross", a song by Iron Maiden on their album The X Factor
 "Sign of the Cross", a song by Terveet Kädet
 "Sign of the Cross", a song by Avantasia on their album The Metal Opera
 "Sign on the Cross", a song by Bob Dylan on the album The Bootleg Series Vol. 11: The Basement Tapes Complete